HMS Welcome was a reciprocating engine-powered  built for the Royal Navy during the Second World War. She survived the war and was scrapped in 1962.

Design and description
The ships' complement consisted of 85 officers and ratings.

The reciprocating ships had two vertical triple-expansion steam engines, each driving one shaft, using steam provided by two Admiralty three-drum boilers.

The Algerine class was armed with a QF  Mk V anti-aircraft gun and four twin-gun mounts for Oerlikon 20 mm cannon. The latter guns were in short supply when the first ships were being completed and they often got a proportion of single mounts. By 1944, single-barrel Bofors 40 mm mounts began replacing the twin 20 mm mounts on a one for one basis. All of the ships were fitted for four throwers and two rails for depth charges.

Construction and career
Welcome was ordered on 19 December 1942 and was built by Lobnitz & Co. Ltd, Renfrew, Scotland. She was laid down on 3 May 1944 and launched on 14 November 1944 and displaced 860 tons. She was completed in 1945 and commissioned on 20 January 1945.

In May 1945, Welcome joined the 10th Minesweeping Flotilla, and sailed for the Far East in October 1945, returning to British waters in July 1946. In September 1946, she was assigned to fishery protection duties in the Fishery Protection Squadron. In 1953 she took part in the Fleet Review to celebrate the Coronation of Queen Elizabeth II. Welcome remained on fishery protection duties until December 1957, when she passed into the reserves. She was scrapped on 3 May 1962.

References

Bibliography

External links
 HMS Welcome at uboat.net
  HMS Welcome at battleships-cruisers.co.uk

 

1944 ships
Ships built on the River Clyde
Algerine-class minesweepers of the Royal Navy
Ships of the Fishery Protection Squadron of the United Kingdom